Fondation Botnar is a philanthropic foundation based in Basel, Switzerland. The foundation was founded in 2003 by Marcela Botnar, wife of businessman and philanthropist Octav Botnar. It is one of the largest foundations in Switzerland, holding CHF 3.8 billion in assets.  Fondation Botnar champions the use of AI and digital technologies to improve the health and wellbeing of children and young people in growing urban environments. The foundation provides a range of funding opportunities to enable research and innovative projects that fit within its strategic focus.

History 
In 2003, Fondation Botnar was founded by Marcela Botnar to continue the philanthropic work of herself and her husband Octav Botnar.

Following the death of Marcela and Octav Botnar’s only child, Camelia Eugenia Botnar, who died in 1972 at the age of 20 in a car accident, the couple focused on philanthropic work and funded several large projects in their daughter’s name. When Octav Botnar died, Marcela continued the giving and carried out the wish of Octav Botnar and created Fondation Botnar. Fondation Botnar was the sole beneficiary of Marcela Botnar’s will.

Projects 
Fondation Botnar supports a range of projects and initiatives within its strategic area of focus.

OurCity 
OurCity is one of Fondation Botnar’s key initiatives, aiming to support selected cities around the world to implement coordinated programs that leverage digital technologies and artificial intelligence (AI), and transform them into places where young people’s wellbeing and opportunity is secured. The foundation sees OurCity as a process that will catalyse stakeholders and drive policy change through inclusive engagement and advocacy. The initiative collaborates with young people, civil society, policymakers, innovators, and other city champions to nurture wellbeing and opportunity for all.

African Youth Digital Innovation Platform 
Fondation Botnar works with Unicef on the African Youth Digital Innovation Platform. The project aims to catalyse young people’s creativity and ideas on how to create economically viable business models and employment opportunities for young people across the African region.

Healthy Cities for Adolescents 
Fondation Botnar funds the Healthy Cities for Adolescents Program, an  initiative managed by the International Society of Urban Health (ISUH). The program fosters multi-stakeholder, community-led consortium representing diverse groups including partners from government, civil society, and the private sector to address the health and wellbeing of young people in secondary cities.

D-Tree International
Since June 2018, the foundation has worked together with the Human Development Innovation Fund (HDIF) and have awarded D-tree international more than $6 million to work with the Zanzibar Ministry of Health and key partners to roll out a national digital community health system to improve maternal, newborn, and child health services. The project will assist community health workers and equip them with digital technology to manage care for families, women and children.

Also, with D-tree international, is the Afya-Tek program, a consortium of five organisations that are working to improve the decision-making and quality of care in Tanzania. Afya-Tek offers a digital link between patients, government health facilities, community health workers, and the private sector drug dispensers known as Accredited Drug Dispensing Outlets.

Botnar Research Centre for Child Health

In September 2018 it was announced that Fondation Botnar had given CHF 100 million to finance the founding of the Botnar Research Centre for Child Health (BRCCH). The research centre has been set up by the University of Basel and ETH Zurich. The purpose of the centre is to develop new methods and digital innovations that can be used in paediatrics around the world, especially resource-poor countries.

Ada Health Partnership

Fondation Botnar announced a new partnership with Ada Health in 2018. The partnership aims to bring AI-powered healthcare to East Africa and Romania. The partnership has resulted in Ada's app becoming the first health guidance app to feature Swahili language integration, making its health assessment technology available to more than 100 million people in Sub-Saharan Africa.

UNICEF Romania

In Romania, Fondation Botnar contributes to an initiative run by UNICEF that is developing and implementing a community-based services modelling project in Romania's Bacau region - one of the poorest regions in Europe. The project is recruiting community workers and equipping them with a digital tablet application to maintain up to date information on families and children within the region, taking the user through a list of questions. The data can then be used to prescribe precision steps and packages to help the children, such as immunisation or education intervention. It can also be used to help policy makers understand where resources are needed. The project has so far helped over 54,000 children.

ITU-WHO Focus Group on Artificial Intelligence for Health 
The inter-agency collaboration between the World Health Organization and the ITU, the ITU-WHO Focus Group on Artificial Intelligence for Health was funded by the foundation.

Partnerships 
Fondation Botnar has memberships in the following partnerships/organisations.

 Member, Partnership for Maternal, Newborn & Child Health
 Member, ITU-T Study Group 16: Multimedia
 Member, European Foundation Centre 
 Member, SwissFoundations 
 Member, European Venture Philanthropy Association (EVPA) 
 Endorser, Digital Donor Principles 
 Endorser, Principles for Digital Development

References 

Children's charities based in Switzerland
Organisations based in Basel